The Thousandfold Epicentre is the second and final full-length studio album by Dutch occult-themed rock group The Devil's Blood.

Writing and recording
The album was reportedly composed over a period of eleven months from January 2010 to November 2010 before it was recorded over a period of two months at Void Studios with longtime producer, engineer, and mixer Pieter Kloos. Several songs were ultimately shortened by a few minutes so that the album length would not exceed the length of a CD

Release and promotion
The album was first released in Europe on 11 November 2011 through VÁN Records and later in the United States through Metal Blade Records on 17 January 2012. The album has been released by both labels in CD, LP, and digital download formats. A limited edition version of the album, which includes a 36-page art book, has also been made available through VÁN Records.

On 9 December 2011 the track "Fire Burning" was featured on Pitchfork for streaming. And on 9 January 2012 the track "Die The Death" was featured on Decibel for streaming. A seven part video teaser series featuring song samples and album artwork were released by the band in the weeks leading up to the albums US release date.

Critical reception
The album has received mainly positive reviews from music critics. Metacritic assigned an average score of 79 to the album based on 6 reviews, which indicates "generally favorable reviews". Noisecreep placed the album at #4 in their "Best Albums of 2011" list.

The album debuted at "76" in the Dutch Albums Top 100, remaining in that position for a period of one week.

Track listing

Personnel
The Thousandfold Epicentre album personnel adapted from Allmusic.

 Farida Lemouchi "F. the Mouth of Satan" - vocals
 Selim Lemouchi "SL" - composer, lyrics, guitar
 Rob Oorthuis - composer, guitar
 Koen Lommers - effects, guitar, tape manipulation
 Ron van Herpen - Guitar
 Micha Haring - Drums
 Job van de Zande - bass
 Igor De Wit - percussion
 Arno Landsbergen - Clavinet, Fender Rhodes, Hammond B3, piano
 Tommie Eriksson - composer
 Hans Timmermans - orchestral arrangements
 Pieter Kloos - effects, engineering, mastering, mixing, production, tape manipulation, vocals
 Sitis Aeterna - artwork, design
 Nobody's Fool - artwork, design

References

External links
 

2012 albums
The Devil's Blood albums
Metal Blade Records albums